Palasë ( or Palasa; , Palasa) also Paljasa, is a village in Himarë  municipality (13 kilometres from the town), Vlorë County, southern Albania. It is located near the Llogara National Park and next to the Ionian coast on the Albanian Riviera.

History
In classical antiquity Roman writer Lucan recorded a town named Palaeste on the Ceraunian Mountains, which corresponds to the site area of modern day Palasë. In Palaeste, Julius Caesar landed from Brundusium, in order to carry on the war against Pompey.

According to local legend the settlement was initially located on the coast on a location once known as Meghalihora, but due to pirate attacks in 12th-13th century it was slightly moved inland. In the local Greek dialect of Himara the change /st/ > /s/ is a typical phonetic rule. Thus if Palaeste is linguistically connected with modern Greek Paliasa then this change must have taken place before 1582. In 1632 an Albanian-language school was founded in Palasë. In 1663 a Greek school was established in Palasa.

The Italian missionary Giuseppe Schiro wrote that in 1722 Palasë was inhabited by Greeks.  It is still not clear if there was any significant migration to or from the village. Andrei Sobolev in fieldwork in the 21st century further documented that the families Babe, Gjinajt, Çaço, Paço, Xhelilaj, and Mëhilli hailed from Dukat, while few others (Milaj, Papadhates) from Krujë and the Peloponnese. In 1720, the villages of Himara, Palasa, Ilias, Vuno, Pilur and Qeparo refused to submit to the Pasha of Delvina.

Until the 1750s Himarë was composed of more than 50 villages, but by the end of the 1780s it comprised only 16, situated by the seashore from Saranda to Palasë. Later on, with Ali Pasha's defeat, the region of Himara shrunk to only seven villages. In 1872 a Greek elementary school was operating in Palasa sponsored by a wealthy local, Nasios Dimoulis.

At 1914 Palasa joined the movement of Spyros Spyromilios during the establishment of the Autonomous Republic of Northern Epirus. In September 1916, the provinces of Himarë and Tepelenë became part of the Vlorë prefecture and were placed under the control of the Italian armed forces. The city of Himarë became the official capital of the region and was responsible for the administration of the traditionally Orthodox coastal villages of Palasë, Dhërmi, Kudhës, Qeparo, Vuno and Iljas. With the incorporation of the region in the Albanian state the locals were officially recognized as part of the Greek minority. In 1934 part of the local population asked for intervention by the League of Nations for the opening of a Greek school in the village. However, the minority status in Palasë was revoked during the People's Republic of Albania with the explanation that there were not enough Greek speakers.

Geography
The village is located several kilometres northwest of the town of Dhërmi, and is accessed via the main road leading out of the town. The Llogara Pass and Çika Mountain are nearby. The Thunderbolt Mountains, the western chain of the Ceraunian Mountains, enclose the area on its northern and northeastern side. The area opens up on its southwestern side with the mountain of Çika and descends towards the Ionian coast, with the Greek Islands of Othonas and Corfu in the distance.

The village contains narrow stone roads and quaint white houses and is built around a 400-year-old platanus  (plane tree), which is central to village life and the pride of the village. Geologically the terrain belongs to the western part of the Ionian Tectonic plate. This section of the coastline is referred to by geologists as the Palasë-Butrint coastline. Palasë's beach is 1.5 kilometres in length.

North of Palasë, is located a small bay, named Gramma ('letter' in Greek), accessible only by sea, with the surrounding cliffs containing various epigraphs, texts and symbols, perhaps carved out by sailors.

Language
The inhabitants of Palasë are bilingual as they mainly speak a variant of the Himariote Greek dialect, and partly the Tosk Albanian. The local Greek idiom retains features of an older Greek linguistic substratum. Though Greek speakers the locals are also fluent in Albanian. Bilingualism in Palasa often takes the form of compartmentalized or situational, bilingualism. In this form of bilingualism, different languages are used in different social contexts. In Palasa, Greek is used in the context of Greek Orthodox rituals, while Albanian is used in transmitting traditional, folk mythological rituals. Lexical borrowings from Albanian to Greek are found in the terminology which concerns village life. It indicates that the culture of the village was originally Albanian and reflects the function of the older language (Albanian) as prevailing in affairs of village life.

Toponyms of Greek origin are found more densely in the area of Palasë than in other area of southern Albanian coast. Some of them are of archaic origin and preserve unique features of the Greek language.

Notable people
Aleks Caci, writer and publicist
Paskal Milo (born 1949), politician

Movies
The 1987 film The Waxed Shirts (albanian: Këmishët me dyllë) was filmed in Palasë.

See also
Palaeste
Ceraunian Mountains
Caesar's Beach
Chaonians
Dhermi
Greeks in Albania
Himara
Himariote Greek dialect
Tourism in Albania

References

Sources 

Beaches of Albania
Populated places in Himara
Epirus
Albanian Ionian Sea Coast
Labëria
Greek communities in Albania
Villages in Vlorë County